Thomas William Anson, 1st Earl of Lichfield PC (20 October 1795 – 18 March 1854), previously known as The Viscount Anson from 1818 to 1831, was a British Whig politician from the Anson family. He served under Lord Grey and Lord Melbourne as Master of the Buckhounds between 1830 and 1834 and under Melbourne Postmaster General between 1835 and 1841. His gambling and lavish entertaining got him heavily into debt and he was forced to sell off the entire contents of his Shugborough Hall estate.

Early life
Anson was the eldest son of Thomas Anson, 1st Viscount Anson, and his wife Anne Margaret, daughter of Thomas Coke, 1st Earl of Leicester. Major-General the Hon. George Anson was his younger brother. He was educated at Eton and Christ Church, Oxford.

Career
Anson was elected to the House of Commons for Great Yarmouth in June 1818, but had to resign the seat already the following month on the death of his father and his succession to viscountcy of Anson. Anson later served under Lord Grey and Lord Melbourne as Master of the Buckhounds from 1830 to 1834 and under Melbourne as Postmaster General from 1835 to 1841. He was admitted to the Privy Council in 1830 and in 1831 he was created Earl of Lichfield, of Lichfield in the County of Stafford, in William IV's coronation honours.

Gambling
Anson was also known for his excessive gambling and lavish entertaining at his Shugborough Hall seat. He also purchased the estate at nearby Ranton, Staffordshire, where he built Abbey House and developed the estate into a great sporting centre. However, his extravagant lifestyle and gambling put him and the family into debts of £600,000 and led to Anson's financial collapse in 1842. The entire contents of Shugborough Hall were sold off to pay for the debts.  Abbey House at Ranton burned down in 1942. The ivy-covered ruins can still be seen.

Personal life
Lord Lichfield married Louisa Catherine, daughter of Nathaniel Philips, in 1819. They had four sons and four daughters, being:
 Lady Louisa Mary Ann Anson (1819–1882), who married Lt.-Col. Edward King-Tenison (d. 1878) of Kilronan Castle, in 1838 and had issue.
 Lady Anne Frederica Anson (1823–1896), who married Francis Charteris, 10th Earl of Wemyss, in 1843 and had issue.
 Thomas George Anson, 2nd Earl of Lichfield (1825–1892)
 Lady Harriet Frances Maria Anson (1827–1898), who married Augustus Venables-Vernon, 6th Baron Vernon, in 1851 and had issue.
 Hon. William Victor Leopold Horatio Anson (1833–1856)
 Lt.-Col. Hon. Augustus Henry Archibald Anson (1835–1877), a soldier who received the Victoria Cross for service during the Indian Mutiny of 1857, he later served Member of Parliament for Lichfield. In 1863, he married Amelia Maria Claughton (1844–1894), eldest daughter of the Rt. Rev. Thomas Legh Claughton, Bishop of St Albans, by the former Hon. Julia Susanna Ward (eldest daughter of William Humble Ward, 10th Baron Ward) and sister of Sir Gilbert Henry Claughton, 1st Baronet. They did not have children. After Anson's death, his widow married, as his second wife, George Campbell, 8th Duke of Argyll in 1881.
 Lady Gwendoline Isabella Anna Maria Anson (1837–1912), who married 19 Apr 1865 Nicholas Power O'Shee, of Gardenmorris, co. Waterford (d. 30 Mar 1902), and had issue.
 Rt. Rev. Hon. Adelbert John Robert Anson, a clergyman who served as Bishop of Qu'Apelle in Canada (1840–1909).

Lord Lichfield died aged 58 in March 1854 and is buried at St Michael and All Angels Church in Colwich, a short distance from Shugborough Hall. He was succeeded in the earldom by his eldest son, Thomas. Lady Lichfield survived him by over 25 years and died in August 1879.

See also
Ranton, Staffordshire
Shugborough Hall

References

External links 
 

|-

1795 births
1854 deaths
Whig (British political party) MPs for English constituencies
1st Earl of Lichfield
Members of the Privy Council of the United Kingdom
Members of the Parliament of the United Kingdom for English constituencies
UK MPs 1818–1820
UK MPs who inherited peerages
UK MPs who were granted peerages
Politics of the Borough of Great Yarmouth
Thomas
Masters of the Buckhounds
People educated at Eton College
Alumni of Christ Church, Oxford
Peers of the United Kingdom created by William IV